Sadegh Mahsouli (born 9 March 1959) is an Iranian politician who was Minister of Interior from 2008 to 2009 and Minister of Welfare and Social Security from 2009 to 2011. He was appointed to this post on 19 November 2009, as part of President Mahmoud Ahmadinejad's second cabinet after a  Parliamentary vote. From 24 March 2008 to 9 August 2009, he was Minister of Interior of Ahmadinejad's first cabinet.
He was succeeded Ali Kordan who was impeached by Parliament in November 2008.

Mahsouli withdrew his nomination once when the president nominated him for the position of oil minister in 2005 after admitted to Iranian parliament that he was worth $160 million.

In 2011, it was announced that Ministry of Welfare will be merged with Ministry of Labour and Mahsouli will be left cabinet after it.

Mahsouli was in charge of the Ministry of Interior when the alleged vote rigging happened in Iran's presidential election in June 2009.

June 13 Letter 
On June 18, a letter was presented by Iranian filmmakers Marjane Satrapi (director of the critically Acclaimed Film Persepolis) and has since been widely circulated with Mousavi Supporters. No verification of the letter has been provided. The letter was allegedly written by Interior Minister Sadegh Mahsouli to Ayatollah Khamenei on June 13 (a day after the elections), states the fraud and lists the authentic vote count. A quick view of the letter shows that it was fake. The letter was roughly translated as follows;

"Salaam Aleikum.

Following your concerns regarding the results of the presidential election and per your given discretion to have Dr. Mahmoud Ahmadinejad remains as president during this sensitive juncture. Therefore, everything has been planned in a way that the public announcement will be made in accordance with the interests of the regime and the revolution. All necessary precautions have been taken to deal with any unexpected events of election aftermath and the intense monitoring of all the parties' leaders as well as the election candidates.

However, some believe that the real votes counted are as follows:

Total number of votes: 43,026,078

Mir Hossein Mousavi: 19,075,623

Mehdi Karoubi: 13,387,104

Mahmoud Ahmadinejad: 5,698,417

Mohsen Rezaee: 3,754,218

Void: 38,716

Minister of Interior

Sadegh Mahsouli"

References 

1959 births
Living people
People from Urmia
Iranian businesspeople
20th-century Iranian businesspeople
Interior Ministers of Iran
Front of Islamic Revolution Stability politicians
Islamic Revolutionary Guard Corps personnel of the Iran–Iraq War
21st-century Iranian politicians